Darrin Reaves (born April 17, 1993) is an American football running back free agent. He signed as an undrafted free agent with the Carolina Panthers in 2014. He played college football at UAB. He also played for the Kansas City Chiefs.

Early years
Darrin Reaves was born on April 17, 1993, in Birmingham, Alabama. Darrin grew up playing for the Wahouma Seminoles in the metro Birmingham area. He went on to star at Clay Chalkville Middle and High School. His best year (2010) was his senior year. He led his 9–4 Cougars to the quarterfinals in the 6A State Playoffs, losing to eventual champion Hoover 35–27. Reaves signed with UAB on signing day 2011.

College career
Reaves attended the University of Alabama at Birmingham from 2011 to 2013. During his career he rushed for 2,343 yards on 496 carries with 27 touchdowns. After his junior season he entered the 2014 NFL Draft.

Professional career

Carolina Panthers
After going undrafted in the 2014 draft, Reaves signed with the Carolina Panthers. He was waived for final roster cuts before the start of the 2014 season, but signed to the team's practice squad on August 31, 2014.

Reaves was released from the Panthers on July 28, 2015.

Kansas City Chiefs
Reaves signed with the Kansas City Chiefs on August 2, 2015. On September 5, 2015, he was cut by the Chiefs. The Chiefs signed him to their practice squad on October 13. On January 18, 2016, the Chiefs signed Reaves to a future/reserve contract.

On September 3, 2016, Reaves was released by the Chiefs and was signed to the practice squad the next day. He signed a reserve/future contract with the Chiefs on January 31, 2017.

On May 7, 2017, the Chiefs reached an injury settlement with Reaves and released him.

References

External links
Carolina Panthers bio
UAB Blazers bio

1993 births
Living people
Players of American football from Alabama
American football running backs
UAB Blazers football players
Carolina Panthers players
African-American players of American football
Kansas City Chiefs players
People from Clay, Alabama
Nebraska Danger players
21st-century African-American sportspeople